Bajrush Sejdiu (Macedonian Cyrillic: Бајруш Сејдиу)  is a Macedonian criminal of Albanian descent that was arrested in police action "Ash" in 2008. He was convicted and sentenced to 12 years in prison in 2011 for money laundering and violence in "Ash 2" case. In his reign he owned several companies in Kumanovo: Tobacco factory, Zhito-Mel, Ken, Bibrok, Iskra, FC Milano, and Milano Arena. After his arrest around 200 workers are out of a job.

References

Macedonian gangsters
Albanian gangsters
Living people
People from Kumanovo
Albanians in North Macedonia
1968 births